In clear and calm weather in Colorado at 1:14 p.m. MDT on Friday, October 2, 1970, a chartered Martin 4-0-4 airliner crashed into a mountain eight miles (13 km) west of Silver Plume. Operated by Golden Eagle Aviation, the twin-engined propliner carried 37 passengers and a crew of three; 29 were killed at the scene and two later died of their injuries while under medical care.

It was one of two aircraft carrying the 1970 Wichita State Shockers football team to Logan, Utah, for a game against Utah State; the second aircraft flew a conventional route and arrived safely in Utah. Pilot errors, including poor in-flight decisions and inadequate pre-flight planning, were officially reported as leading to the crash.

Background
About three months before the crash, Wichita State contracted Golden Eagle Aviation to supply a Douglas DC-6B, to fly the team to away games for the 1970 season. The four-engined DC-6 was a large, powerful aircraft that could accommodate the entire team. Golden Eagle Aviation did not own the DC-6, but had an arrangement with the Jack Richards Aircraft Company to use it. After the agreements were made, the DC-6 was damaged in a windstorm, rendering it unavailable for use.  A pair of Martin 4-0-4s, neither of which had flown since 1967, were re-certified for flight. On October 2, 1970, these were ferried from the Jack Richards Aircraft Company facilities in Oklahoma City to Wichita, instead of the DC-6.

Initial leg
Upon arrival in Wichita, the two aircraft were loaded with luggage and the passengers were boarded. They took off and headed west to a refueling stopover in Denver at Stapleton Airport; from there they would continue to Logan Airport in northern Utah.

The two aircraft were dubbed "Gold" and "Black" after the school colors. "Gold", the aircraft that later crashed, carried the starting players, head coach, and athletic director, as well as their wives, other administrators, boosters, and family. The designated "Black" plane transported the reserve players, assistant coaches, and other support personnel.

The President of Golden Eagle Aviation, 37-year-old Ronald G. Skipper, was the pilot flying "Gold." Although occupying the left seat, he was acting in the capacity of a First Officer because he did not have a type rating on the Martin 4-0-4. During the flight to Denver he visited passengers in the cabin, advising them that after refueling they would take a scenic route, near Loveland Ski Area and Mount Sniktau, the proposed alpine skiing venues for the 1976 Winter Olympics, recently awarded to Denver in May. The captain of the "gold" aircraft was 27-year-old Danny E. Crocker, who occupied the right seat. The other crew flying the "Black" aircraft adhered to the original flight plan and took a more northerly route, heading north from Denver to southern Wyoming then west, using a designated  airway. Less scenic, this route allowed more time to gain altitude for the climb over the Rocky Mountains.

Accident sequence
While the aircraft was refueled and serviced in Denver, First Officer Skipper purchased aeronautical sectional charts for the contemplated scenic route. The National Transportation Safety Board (NTSB) investigation report stated the First Officer testified that he intended to use the charts to help point out landmarks and objects of interest to the passengers. The report concluded the crew did not allow enough time for the charts to be studied properly to avoid high terrain before takeoff commenced.
After takeoff in clear weather, the two aircraft took divergent paths away from Denver.

Shortly before the crash, several witnesses described seeing an aircraft flying unusually low towards the Continental Divide. Crash survivor Rick Stephens was a senior guard and stated in 2013, "...as we flew along over I-70, that there were old mines and old vehicles above us. I noticed we were quite a bit below the top of the mountains. I got up to go to the cockpit, which wasn't unusual to do, and I could tell we were in trouble, looking out the window and seeing nothing but green in front of us."

The overloaded aircraft, nearing Loveland Pass as it flew up Clear Creek Valley, became trapped in a box canyon and was unable to climb above the mountain ridges surrounding it on three sides, nor complete a reversal turn away from the sharply rising terrain. At 1:14 p.m. The NTSB report stated a belief that many on board survived the initial impact, based on the testimony of survivors and rescuers. The load of fuel on board did not explode immediately, allowing survivors to escape the wreckage, but the passenger cabin was eventually consumed by an explosion before those still alive and trapped inside could escape.

Of the total of 40 on board, the death count at the scene was 29, which included 27 passengers, the captain, and flight attendant. One of the deceased passengers was an off-duty flight attendant who was assisting. Two of the initial 11 survivors later died of their injuries to bring the total dead to 31, 14 of whom were Wichita State football players. First to arrive at the crash scene were construction workers from the nearby Eisenhower Tunnel project and motorists on U.S. 6 (I-70). The first officer (company president) survived; he was flying the plane from the left seat.

Probable cause
The National Transportation Safety Board report states that weather played no role in the accident, and lists the probable cause to be that the pilot made improper decisions in-flight or in planning:

Aftermath
The USU president, vice president, provost, athletic director, and athletic information officer were all unavailable in the immediate aftermath of the crash, leaving the game to be canceled by John S. Flannery, a USU Information Services employee. Utah State's football team held a memorial service at the stadium where the game was to have been played and placed a wreath on the 50-yard line. Wichita State University officials and family members of the survivors were flown to Denver on an aircraft made available by Robert Docking, the Governor of Kansas.

Classes at Wichita State were canceled for Monday, October 5, and a memorial service was held that evening on campus at Cessna Stadium. The remaining members of the Wichita State team, with the NCAA and Missouri Valley Conference allowing freshman players to fill out the squad, decided to continue the 1970 season; it was later designated the "Second Season."

Wichita State and Utah State had played in five of the previous six seasons, but never met again in football. Wichita State discontinued varsity football after the 1986 season.

The accident was the first of two college football charter aircraft to crash in 1970; six weeks later, Southern Airways Flight 932, carrying the Marshall University team, crashed in Huntington, West Virginia as the team returned from a game in North Carolina.

Memorials

Wichita State University built a memorial for those who died from the crash called Memorial '70. Every year on October 2 at 9 a.m., a wreath is placed at this memorial.

A roadside memorial plaque listing the names of the victims is located near the Colorado crash site, adjacent to westbound Interstate 70, at Dry Gulch at milepost 217, about two miles (3 km) east of the Eisenhower Tunnel. A trail to the wreck site via Dry Gulch is 0.4 miles past the memorial off exit 216.

Entertainers Bill Cosby and Monty Hall hosted a fundraiser for the Wichita State athletic department after the crash.

See also 
List of accidents involving sports teams
Timeline of college football in Kansas

References

External links
    (alternate link 1, alternate link 2)
Memorial '70 Homepage  – includes survivor recollections, photos of victims
Super70s article about the crash – includes narrative on circumstances leading up to the flight, and lists names of those on board
Roadside memorial adjacent to I-70 near Colorado crash site
Present-day photos of crash site on Mount Trelease  – includes directions for visiting the site, and GPS coordinates
1960s photo of the accident aircraft in Mohawk Airlines livery 
Wichita State University Football Team Airplane Crash Collection – archives related to crash

Wichita State Shockers football
Aviation accidents and incidents in the United States in 1970
Aviation accidents and incidents involving sports teams
Accidents and incidents involving the Martin 4-0-4
Aviation accidents and incidents caused by pilot error
Clear Creek County, Colorado
Airliner accidents and incidents in Colorado
1970 in Colorado
1970 in Kansas
1970 in sports in Colorado
1970 in sports in Kansas
October 1970 events in the United States
Aviation accidents and incidents involving controlled flight into terrain